The Bidjara people, also spelt Bitjara  or Bithara, are an Aboriginal Australian people of south-western Queensland. They spoke a dialect of the Ngura language. They are not to be confused with the Warrego River Pitjara or the Badjiri of the Paroo River, both of whose traditional lands are further to the east of the state.

Country
Their western border lay at the Grey Range. Their northern limits were at Orient, and their eastern frontier was around Clyde.

Social organization and customs
The Bitjara included circumcision in their initiatory rites.

Alternative names
 Bithara.
 Pitteroo.
 Minkabari. (language name),
 Wilya.

Some words
 mirre. (tame dog)
 urni (father)
 ummadi. (mother)
 birri-birri. (whiteman).

Notes

Citations

Sources

Aboriginal peoples of Queensland